Huw or HUW may refer to:
 Huw, a Welsh given name
 Hukumina language, spoken in Indonesia
 Humaitá Airport, in Amazonas, Brazil

See also 
 HEW (disambiguation)
 Hugh (disambiguation)